The Ahmar Mountains is a mountain range of the Ethiopian Highlands, located in the eastern Oromia Region of Ethiopia.

History
This mountain was mentioned by the British explorer Richard F. Burton, whose party traveled along its northern base January 1854, on their way to Harar.

Climate
Elevation is the major factor in temperature levels, with the higher areas, on average, 10 °C (17 °F) cooler, day or night. The overnight lows are not like the "Garden of Eden" because heavy clothes or blankets are needed in the highlands, when the temperature drops to roughly 50–53 °F (10–12.2 °C) at night.

The ecology of this landform is semi-desert.

References

Mountain ranges of Ethiopia
Ethiopian Highlands
Geography of Oromia Region